The 1973–74 Sheffield Shield season was the 72nd season of the Sheffield Shield, the domestic first-class cricket competition of Australia. Victoria won the championship.

Table

Statistics

Most Runs
Greg Chappell 1013

Most Wickets
Geoff Dymock 39

References

Sheffield Shield
Sheffield Shield
Sheffield Shield seasons